The 2021–22 season was Dunfermline Athletic's sixth season in the Scottish Championship, having finished 4th in the 2020–21 season.

Squad list

Results & fixtures

Pre-season

Scottish Championship

Championship play-off

Scottish League Cup

Group stage

Table

Knockout round

Scottish Challenge Cup

Notes

Scottish Cup

Squad statistics

Appearances and goals

|-
|colspan="14"|Players away from the club on loan:
|-

|-
|colspan="14"|Players who left during the season:

|}

Goalscorers

Disciplinary record

Club statistics

League table

Results by round

Results Summary

Transfers

First team

Players in

Players out

Loans in

Loans out

Contract extensions

Notes

References

Dunfermline Athletic F.C. seasons
Dunfermline Athletic